Oscar Edward Bland (November 21, 1877 – August 3, 1951) was a United States representative from Indiana and an associate judge of the United States Court of Customs and Patent Appeals.

Education and career

Born near Bloomfield, Indiana, Bland attended the public schools, Northern Indiana Normal School (now Valparaiso University) and Indiana University Bloomington. He taught school for three years. He read law and was admitted to the bar in 1901 and commenced practice in Linton, Indiana. He served as member of the Indiana Senate from 1907 to 1909.

Congressional service

Bland was an unsuccessful Republican candidate for election to Congress in 1910, 1912, and 1914. He finally prevailed in the election of 1916, and was elected as a Republican to the United States House of Representatives of the 65th, 66th and 67th United States Congresses, serving from March 4, 1917, to March 3, 1923. He served as Chairman of the Committee on Industrial Arts and Expositions in the 66th and 67th Congresses. He was an unsuccessful candidate for reelection in 1922 to the 68th United States Congress.

Federal judicial service

Bland was nominated by President Warren G. Harding on March 2, 1923, to an Associate Judge seat on the United States Court of Customs Appeals (United States Court of Customs and Patent Appeals from March 2, 1929) vacated by Associate Judge Marion De Vries. He was confirmed by the United States Senate on March 3, 1923, and received his commission the same day. His service terminated on December 1, 1947, due to his retirement.

Later career and death

Following his retirement from the federal bench, Bland resumed the private practice of law in Washington, D.C., where he died August 3, 1951. He was interred in Fort Lincoln Cemetery in Washington, D.C.

References

Sources

 

1877 births
1951 deaths
Indiana lawyers
Republican Party Indiana state senators
Indiana University Bloomington alumni
Judges of the United States Court of Customs and Patent Appeals
People from Greene County, Indiana
People from Linton, Indiana
United States Article I federal judges appointed by Warren G. Harding
20th-century American judges
Valparaiso University alumni
United States federal judges admitted to the practice of law by reading law
Republican Party members of the United States House of Representatives from Indiana